Mowmenabad (also Romanized as Mow'menābād) is a village in Kakavand-e Sharqi Rural District, Kakavand District, Delfan County, Lorestan Province, Iran. At the 2006 census, its population was 78, in 17 families.

References 

Towns and villages in Delfan County